The Republic of the Congo women's national volleyball team represents the Republic of the Congo in international women's volleyball competitions and friendly matches.

It qualified for the Volleyball at the 2015 African Games – Women's tournament.

References
Republic of the Congo Volleyball Association

National women's volleyball teams
Volleyball
Volleyball in the Republic of the Congo
Women's sport in the Republic of the Congo